Harry Taylor (born 1968) is a Canadian former international freestyle swimmer who competed for his native country at the 1988 Summer Olympics in Seoul, South Korea.

At the 1986 World Aquatics Championships, Taylor set a Canadian record in the 1500-metre freestyle.  He again set a Canadian record of 15:12.63 in January 1990.  That record was held until 2004 when it was bettered by Kurtis MacGillivary.

At the 1988 Summer Olympics, Taylor competed in the preliminary heats of the men's 1500-metre freestyle, and finished nineteenth overall.

References

1968 births
Living people
Canadian male freestyle swimmers
Olympic swimmers of Canada
Swimmers from Edmonton
Swimmers at the 1988 Summer Olympics